Höörs IS is a Swedish sports club located in Höör in Skåne County, with activities in football and athletics. The club was founded in 1928.

Background
Since their foundation Höörs IS has participated mainly in the middle and lower divisions of the Swedish football league system.  The club currently plays in Division 5 Skåne Mellersta which is the seventh tier of Swedish football. Höörs IS is known for their connections with the Swedish top club Trelleborgs FF. The exchange of players between the clubs has to this day been very successful. They play their home matches at the Färs & Frosta Arena in Höör. Höörs IS are affiliated to Skånes Fotbollförbund.

In the first half of the 20th century, the club also played bandy, taking part in the Skåne district championship in this sport.

Recent history
In recent seasons, the Höörs IS senior football club has competed in the following divisions:

 1999 – Division 5 Skåne Mellersta
 2000 – Division 5 Skåne Östra
 2001 – Division 5 Skåne Mellersta
 2002 – Division 5 Skåne Mellersta
 2003 – Division 5 Skåne Nordöstra
 2004 – Division 4 Skåne Östra
 2005 – Division 4 Skåne Östra
 2006 – Division 4 Skåne Norra
 2007 – Division 3 Södra Götaland
 2008 – Division 4 Skåne Norra
 2009 – Division 4 Skåne Norra
 2010 – Division 3 Södra Götaland
 2011 – Division 3 Södra Götaland
 2012 – Division 3 Södra Götaland
 2013 – Division 3 Södra Götaland
 2014 – Division 4 Skåne Västra
 2015 – Division 5 Skåne Mellersta
 2016 – Division 5 Skåne Mellersta

Attendances

In recent seasons Höörs IS have had the following average attendances:

Footnotes

External links
 Höörs IS – Official website

Sport in Skåne County
Football clubs in Skåne County
Association football clubs established in 1928
Bandy clubs established in 1928
Defunct bandy clubs in Sweden